The 1934 municipal election was held November 14, 1934 to elect a mayor and six aldermen to sit on Edmonton City Council and three trustees to sit on each of the public and separate school boards.

There were ten aldermen on city council, but four of the positions were already filled: Margaret Crang (SS), Harry Ainlay (SS), Ralph Bellamy, and James Findlay were all elected to two-year terms in 1933 and were still in office.  Rice Sheppard (SS) was also elected to a two-year term in 1933, but had resigned in order to run for mayor; accordingly, Athelstan Bissett (SS) was elected to a one-year term.

There were seven trustees on the public school board, but four of the positions were already filled:   Albert Ottewell (SS), Frank Crang (SS), Walter Morrish, and Sidney Bowcott had all been elected to two-year terms in 1933 and were still in office.  The same was true of the separate school board, where Charles Gariepy, T Malone, Thomas Magee, and J Tansey (SS) were continuing.

Voter turnout

There were 27,683 ballots cast out of 45,589 eligible voters, for a voter turnout of 60.7%.

Results

 bold or  indicates elected
 italics indicate incumbent
 "SS", where data is available, indicates representative for Edmonton's South Side, with a minimum South Side representation instituted after the city of Strathcona, south of the North Saskatchewan River, amalgamated into Edmonton on February 1, 1912.

Mayor

Aldermen

Public school trustees

Separate (Catholic) school trustees

Names and vote totals of defeated candidates are no longer available.

References

Election History, City of Edmonton: Elections and Census Office

1934
1934 elections in Canada
1934 in Alberta